Herman Sikumbang (17 March 1982 – 22 December 2018) was an Indonesian guitarist who was also part of the Indonesian pop band Seventeen from 1999 to 2018. He died on 22 December 2018 at the age of 36 during the 2018 Sunda Strait tsunami as the band performed onstage. He married Juliana Moechtar in 2012 and he is survived by his wife.

He was set to run for a seat in the People's Representative Council (DPR) in the 2019 Indonesian legislative election for the Partai Kebangkitan Bangsa (PKB).

Death 
The pop band Seventeen was performing at an event held by state electric company PLN at the Tanjung Lesung resort near the shore of Tanjung Lesung beach when the tidal waves hit their stage around 9:30PM local time. Guitarist Herman died during the late hours of the tsunami breakout as he went missing during the tsunami.

The PKB, along with Deputy Speaker of the People's Consultative Assembly and PKB politician Muhaimin Iskandar,  expressed their  condolences to Sikumbang's loss.

Discography 
 Bintang Terpilih (1999)
 Sweet Seventeen (2005)
 Lelaki Hebat (2008)
 Dunia Yang Indah (2011)
 Sang Juara (2013)
 Pantang Mundur (2016)

References 

1982 births
2018 deaths
People from Tidore
Indonesian guitarists
National Awakening Party politicians
Deaths in tsunamis
Natural disaster deaths in Indonesia
Filmed deaths of entertainers
Filmed deaths during natural disasters